Clairemont (or Clairemont Mesa) is a community within the city of San Diego, California, United States. Clairemont Mesa is bordered by Interstate 805 on the east, Interstate 5 to the west, State Route 52 to the north, and the community of Linda Vista to the south. The community of Clairemont Mesa can be subdivided into the neighborhoods of North Clairemont, Clairemont Mesa East, Clairemont Mesa West, Bay Park, and Bay Ho.

History

Prior to in-migration by Europeans, the area was populated by the Kumeyaay people. The Spanish arrived in 1542 and founded Mission Basilica San Diego de Alcalá nearby in 1769.  Judge Hyde was one of the first settlers of Clairemont and began farming in Tecolote Canyon in 1872. Farming and ranching continued in the area until World War II.

In 1887 the Morena Subdivision was mapped.

In 1887 a train depot was constructed in the vicinity of Kane Street and Morena Boulevard to accommodate potential buyers in the Morena Subdivision. It was torn down in the early 1920s.

In 1936 the Bay Park Village Subdivision was approved by the City Council. This project, located immediately south of Morena Subdivision and south of Milton Street featured  or larger lots for single-family homes.

In 1939 Bay Park Elementary School was constructed at 2433 Denver Street.

In 1950, Carlos Tavares and Lou Burgener developed what became San Diego's largest post-war subdivision. Originally dubbed "The Village Within a City", people started living in this new Clairemont subdivision in May 1951. The community was named after Tavares's wife, Claire. The design of this new subdivision represented a new concept in community living because it did not incorporate the traditional grid system of uniform blocks and streets. Instead, winding streets and scenic view lots took advantage of the canyons and bluffs overlooking Mission Bay. The first homes, built by Burgener and Tavares Construction Company, had highly customized floor plans.

The developers assembled the necessary acreage to develop Clairemont from three primary land holdings: the Peavey Cattle Ranch, Mission Bay Heights (owned by the Hazard Family), and Tecolote Heights (owned by Jack & Dan Danciger). Before any homes were built in the new development, Tavares & Burgener invested $125,000 in off-street improvements including sewers, water, and access roads; this was necessary because the proposed development was not adjacent to any developed areas. The original subdivision map that used the name “Clairemont” for the first time was approved and recorded by the County of San Diego on October 16, 1950. The map was named "Clairemont Unit #1, Map #2725". This is the area in Clairemont that includes Deerpark Drive, Burgener Boulevard, and Grandview Street from Field Street to Jellett Street. According to Burgener, "Between 1952 & 1954, seven homes were constructed a day". It is also noted that Clairemont was the largest development of its kind in the country.

Within a few years, several thousand houses had been constructed, including single family homes, duplexes and apartments. Since Clairemont was somewhat removed from the city proper, commercial business and retail shopping, schools, libraries and other city amenities were designed into the overall plan. Although the concept of suburban living is commonplace today, this approach was considered novel. Tavares' vision for Clairemont had far-reaching implications for San Diego, as it stretched the city limits outward and began the now familiar pattern of migration from city to suburb.

Marian Bear Memorial Park (aka San Clemente Canyon) and Tecolote Canyon Natural Park were officially designated as parks by the City of San Diego in the 1960s and 1970s.

Geography

Clairemont's main geographical characteristics appear as a terrain of sandstone coastal mesas with canyons eroded by seasonal streams that support riparian woodlands.  The predominant topographical features are the gently rolling mesas which are separated by canyons. These mesas are where most of the development is confined.  The main canyon system was given the name Tecolote, by Spanish speaking persons after the native owl that lives in this canyon.  Tecolote Canyon Natural Park is a protected part the City of San Diego's large parks system. Tecolote Canyon runs north-south through the center of this community, with branches to the northeast.  Tecolote Creek, a seasonal stream, runs through the canyon.  San Clemente Canyon runs east-west, bordering the community on the north side. Trails extend through both canyons for hiking or mountain biking. The geology in Clairemont is primarily sedimentary.

The native vegetation is primarily chaparral.  Trees include Coast Live Oak, California sycamore, and formerly Engelmann Oak.  Wildlife in the canyons includes coyotes, rabbits, feral parrots, and owls (from which Tecolote Canyon takes its name).

Many neighborhoods have views of Mission Bay and the Pacific Ocean on the west, and Fortuna Mountain and Cowles Mountain to the east. Neighborhoods along Tecolote Canyon have views of this preserved open space canyon system.

Attractions and activities

City of San Diego Parks in and around Clairemont Mesa-

Tecolote Canyon Natural Park - Tecolote Canyon runs through the community of Clairemont Mesa and was dedicated by the City of San Diego as Tecolote Canyon Natural Park in 1977. There are multiple entrances to park throughout the community; some of these entrances provide public parking and bathroom facilities.

Marian Bear Memorial Park - Also known as San Clemente Canyon, it was officially renamed to Marian Bear Memorial Park by the City of San Diego in 1960. The main entrances to the park are off of Regents Road and Genesee Avenue. Both of these entrances provide public parking, restrooms and picnic benches.

North Clairemont Community Park - Located at 4421 Bannock Avenue in North Clairemont.  This 14.5 acre park has Basketball courts, Multi-purpose sports fields, playgrounds, and a tennis court.

MacDowell Neighborhood Park - Located at 5173 Arvinels Avenue in North Clairemont, just north of Innovation Middle School which was previously known as MacDowell School.  This 3.14 acre park features wide lawns with shade trees and a playground.  A walk/bike path begins in park and runs south to Clairemont Mesa Blvd west of I-805.  Rough trails also lead north into San Clemente Canyon and the Marion Bear Memorial Park trail system.

Gershwin Neighborhood Park - Located at 3508 Conrad Avenue in North Clairemont. This 5.39 acre park features basketball courts, a playground, comfort station, and a tennis court.

Cadman Community Park - Located at 4280 Avati Drive in Clairemont, this 8.36 acre park has baseball, basketball, tennis and a tot lot.

Olive Grove Park - Olive Grove Park is located at 5951 Printwood Way in the Clairemont Mesa East neighborhood.  It was built on the site of an olive farm that was one of the area's previous uses before re-development as a residential suburb beginning in the 1950s.

Mount Etna Neighborhood Park - Located at 4741 Mt. Etna Drive in Clairemont Mesa.  A 7.32 acre park with three baseball fields, a playground, and a comfort station.

Western Hills Neighborhood Park - Located at 4810 Kane Street in the Bay Park neighborhood of Clairemont. This 12.82 acre park has basketball courts, a playground, and a scenic canyon location.

Mount Acadia Neighborhood Park - Located at 3865 Mt. Acadia Boulevard in Clairemont Mesa.  This 9.13 acre park has two softball fields, a playground, a tot lot, and a comfort station.

East Clairemont Athletic Area - Located at 3451 Mt. Acadia Boulevard in Clairemont Mesa.  This 9.13 acre sports park has three softball fields, a baseball field, a playground, and a comfort station.

Tecolote Golf Course - This 18-hole  golf course located within Tecolote Canyon.  A natural creek-bed  runs through the golf course, which was designed by Robert Trent Jones Sr. and Sam Snead.

YMCA's Krause Family Skate & Bike Park - This destination park is affiliated with the Mission Valley YMCA but is located in the San Diego community of Clairemont Mesa at 3401 Clairemont Drive, San Diego, CA 92117. Skateboards, bikes, scooters, and inline skates are allowed. The large facility includes beginner, intermediate and advanced skate and BMX courses, a street area, mini ramps, a concrete pool, and the former Dew Tour vert ramp. In addition, the park houses the world's first and only Skatercross track, completed in 2016. The park is open to visitors with paid daily or monthly passes. As of summer 2017, the park was undergoing renovations; with old ramps being torn down and replaced in anticipation of the 2017 Clash at Clairemont, an event sponsored by professional skater Andy Macdonald.

Education

Public educational facilities in Clairemont consist of twelve elementary schools, two middle schools, two senior high schools and a community college. Five schools with specialized educational programs are also located in Clairemont. San Diego Unified School District operates public schools in the Clairemont neighborhood.

Elementary and middle schools
 Alcott Elementary
 Bay Park Elementary 
 Cadman Elementary 
 The Child's Primary School
 CPMA Middle School (Creative Performing Media Arts)
 Field Elementary 
 Hawthorne Elementary 
 Holmes Elementary 
 Innovation Middle School
 LaFayette Elementary 
 Lindbergh/Schweitzer Elementary School
 Maria Montessori Schools
 Marston Jr. High
 Ross Elementary 
 Sequoia Elementary 
 Toler 
 Whitman Elementary

Special education
 Longfellow Magnet 
 Muir Alternative
 Riley Alternative School 
 Schweitzer
 Wiggen

Senior high schools
 Clairemont High School
 James Madison High School

College
 San Diego Mesa College

Supplementary education
 In 2015 the Minato School, a weekend Japanese school, began using Madison High to hold classes.

Notable residents
 John P. Dolan, Catholic prelate
 Adam Gnade, novelist
 Mark Hamill, actor, played Luke Skywalker in Star Wars films
 Ken Henderson, former Major League Baseball player 1965-1980
Major Garrett, journalist
 Kris Jenner, television personality, star of reality TV show Keeping Up With The Kardashians
 Kevin Mitchell, baseball player and 1989 National League MVP, San Francisco Giants
 Shawn Nelson, U.S. Army veteran and plumber who stole a tank and drove it around Clairemont
 Cleophus Prince Jr., the "Clairemont Killer"
 Nawaf al-Hazmi, alleged 9/11 hijacker
 Kendra Wilkinson, model and television personality
 Luís Alberto Urrea, writer and poet
 Pete Wilson, former mayor of San Diego and governor of California
 Todd Gloria, politician, Mayor of San Diego, California

References

External links

Clairemont Community News
City of San Diego website - Clairemont Mesa community profile

 
Neighborhoods in San Diego
Populated places established in 1950
1950 establishments in California